The 2006 Division 1 was contested by 28 teams divided into two groups geographically. Enköpings SK and IF Sylvia won their respective groups and were promoted to Superettan, along with second place-teams IK Sirius and Bunkeflo IF who each one their respective promotion playoffs against teams from Superettan.

League tables

North

South

Young Player Teams of the Year

At the end of each Division 1 season an all-star game is played called "Morgondagens Stjärnor" (English: "The Stars Of Tomorrow"). The two teams playing against each other consist of the best young players from each of the two leagues. However, in 2006, which was the first year of the new Division 1, the game was instead called "FramtidsFajten" (English: "The Future Fight") and the concept was slightly different compared to the following years with the biggest young talents of Division 1 playing against the biggest young talents from the 2006 Division 2 season.

References
Sweden - List of final tables (Clas Glenning)

Swedish Football Division 1 seasons
3
Sweden
Sweden